"Alice Childress" is a song from Ben Folds Five's 1995 self-titled debut album. It was written by Ben Folds and Anna Goodman. The song is a look from a distance at the breakup of a couple who have fundamental differences in their outlooks on life.

History
Despite the name, the song has nothing to do with noted playwright and author Alice Childress.

Anna Goodman, at the time Ben Folds' wife, was inspired to write the lyrics to a song as a parody of Folds' style. Folds has referred to Goodman's lyrics as "bad Folds," a wink to the now-defunct "International Imitation Hemingway Competition" put on by Harry's Bar & Grill in Century City, California. The competition, commonly referred to as "Bad Hemingway", had participants submit "a really good page of really bad Hemingway." Folds was moved by the parody lyrics to write music. He eventually replaced nearly all of Goodman's words "line by line" as the focus of the song became clear:

Because of her contributions to the song, Goodman retains a writing credit.

Additional versions
A live version of the song, recorded October 16, 1995, at the Santa Monica, California public radio station KCRW during the program Morning Becomes Eclectic, appears on the 1998 compilation and rarities album Naked Baby Photos.

An in-studio performance of the song was recorded for the 2005 download-only album iTunes Originals - Ben Folds.

Singles
The song has not been released as a single and does not appear in a studio or live version as an additional track on any other single release.

Compilations and soundtracks
The album version of the song appears on the Summer EP, a four song CD released by Passenger/Caroline in 1995 to promote the band to radio programmers.

The live version of the song appears on the 1997 album KCRW: Rare On Air, Vol. 3, put out by the Santa Monica public radio station on Mammoth Records. The album also includes songs by Cowboy Junkies, Fiona Apple, Guided By Voices, Stereolab, and others.

Personnel
Ben Folds – piano, vocals
Darren Jessee – drums
Robert Sledge – bass

Production
Producer: Caleb Southern
Mixing: Marc Becker

References

Alice Childress
1995 songs
Songs written by Ben Folds
Songs written by Anna Goodman